The black-headed sea snake (Hydrophis atriceps) is a marine snake native to waters around Thailand, Vietnam, Singapore, Indonesia, the Philippines and northern Australia, and New Guinea.

References

Hydrophis
Reptiles described in 1864
Taxa named by Albert Günther
Snakes of Australia